I'm Not Single (translates as Aku Bukan Bujang in Malay) is Malaysian Malay-language romantic comedy film directed by Pierre Andre. It was released on 24 July 2008. A series of road tour has been launched to promote the film.

Synopsis
The movie tells of a young couple Maya and Adam who loathe each other because they are forced into an arranged marriage by their parents. Maya's ailing grandmother wants her to marry as soon as possible despite the fact that she already has a steady boyfriend, Dani. Dani and Maya love each other and had even planned to marry previously. With the arranged marriage looming closer, Dani has to try and figure out how to stop from Maya been taken away from him forever.

Cast
 Farid Kamil as Adam
 Lisa Surihani as Maya
 Awal Ashaari as Dani
 Intan Ladyana as Lisa
 Ahmad Idham as Ahmad
 David Teo as David 
 Dato' Jalaluddin Hassan as Borhan
 Fadilah Mansor as June
 Hafidzuddin Fazil as Ghani
 Aznah Hamid as Su
 Ruminah Sidek as Nenek
 Cat Farish as Psycho

Awards
The film was nominated for two categories in the 21st Malaysian Film Festival, 2008.

Nominated
 Best Film - Nominated

Won
 Most Promising Actress - Lisa Surihani

External links
 

2008 films
2008 romantic comedy films
Malay-language films
Films with screenplays by Pierre Andre
Films directed by Pierre Andre
Metrowealth Pictures films
Films produced by David Teo
Malaysian romantic comedy films